Iordanca-Rodica Iordanov (born 11 March 1976) is a Moldovan jurist and environmentalist currently serving as the Minister of Environment of Moldova in the Recean Cabinet.

Notes 

1976 births

Living people